The Church of St Barnabas and St James the Greater, Walthamstow, is an Edwardian era Church of England parish church in Walthamstow, East London. It is a Grade II* listed building.

History
The church originated in 1900 when an iron mission church was erected on a plot of land in the parish of St Saviour in Markhouse Road, and a separate ecclesiastical parish was created for the church in 1901. The land for the church was donated by Richard Foster, a wealthy City of London merchant who had supported the building of several other new churches in the area; he also funded the construction of a permanent church building, church hall and vicarage, intended to serve the residents of the new Warner Estate.

The church was built between 1902 and 1903 to the design by W. D. Caröe, in the Arts and Crafts style of Perpendicular Gothic, and was dedicated on 7 November 1903 by Edgar Jacob, the Bishop of St Albans. 

In 1961 the parish of St Barnabas was united with that of St James the Greater Church in St James Street, Walthamstow, which had closed in the previous year and was subsequently demolished. A new chapel dedicated to St James was formed in the south aisle of St Barnabas, which included the altar from the former church. In 1981, the church was given grade II* listed building status.

Gallery

References

Church of England church buildings in the London Borough of Waltham Forest
Grade II* listed buildings in the London Borough of Waltham Forest
Grade II* listed churches in London
Buildings by W. D. Caröe
Churches completed in 1902
Walthamstow
1902 establishments in England
20th-century Church of England church buildings